Anton Treuer is an American academic and author specializing in the Ojibwe language and American Indian studies. He is professor of Ojibwe at Bemidji State University, Minnesota and a 2008 Guggenheim Fellow.

Early life and education
Anton Treuer was born in Washington, D.C. in 1969 to Robert and Margaret Treuer. Robert Treuer was an Austrian Jew and Holocaust survivor. Margaret Treuer was an enrolled member of the White Earth Ojibwe Nation and a lifelong resident of the Leech Lake Reservation. She was a tribal judge and was the first female Indian attorney in the State of Minnesota. Anton Treuer grew up in and around the Leech Lake Reservation in Minnesota and went to high school in Bemidji. He was awarded a BA from Princeton in 1991 and an MA in 1994 and PhD in 1996 from the University of Minnesota.

His brother, David Treuer, is also a writer and academic.

Academic career and work
Anton Treuer has authored or edited 18 books. He also edits the only academic journal about the Ojibwe language, the Oshkaabewis Native Journal. After serving as Assistant Professor of History at the University of Wisconsin-Milwaukee from 1996-2000, Treuer returned to his home town of Bemidji as Professor of Ojibwe, a position he still holds today. Treuer's publications and academic work have remained very broad. The Assassination of Hole in the Day was a major historical research project. Everything You Wanted to Know About Indians But Were Afraid to Ask is designed as a broadly accessible general reader book on American Indians. He has also published extensively in linguistics and Ojibwe language. He is widely recognized as one of the most prolific scholars of Ojibwe, and at the forefront of a movement to textualize this formerly oral language in hopes of preserving and revitalizing it. Treuer has also worked extensively with the Ojibwe language immersion efforts underway in Minnesota, Wisconsin, and Ontario. He is part of a team of scholars developing Rosetta Stone for Ojibwe with the Mille Lacs Band of Ojibwe. Treuer has presented all over the United States of America, Canada, and in several other countries on his publications, cultural competence and equity, tribal sovereignty and history, Ojibwe language and culture, and strategies for addressing the "achievement gap."

Publications
 Living Our Language: Ojibwe Tales and Oral Histories (ed.), Minnesota Historical Society Press, 2001
 Ojibwe in Minnesota, Minnesota Historical Society, 2010.
 The Assassination of Hole in the Day, Borealis, 2012 
 Everything You Wanted to Know About Indians But Were Afraid to Ask, Minnesota Historical Society Press, 2012.
 Atlas of Indian Nations, National Geographic Society, 2014
 Warrior Nation: A History of the Red Lake Ojibwe, Minnesota Historical Society Press, 2015.
 The Indian Wars: Battles, Bloodshed, and the Fight for Freedom on the American Frontier, National Geographic, 2017.
 The Language Warrior's Manifesto: How to Keep Our Languages Alive No Matter the Odds, Minnesota Historical Society Press, 2020 (finalist for the 2021 Minnesota Book Awards.) 
 The Cultural Toolbox: Traditional Ojibwe Living in the Modern World, Minnesota Historical Society Press, 2021.

Awards
 Sally Ordway Irvine Award for Distinguished Service in Education, 2011
 Pathfinder Award by Association of Tribal Archives, Libraries, and Museums, 2018

References

External links

1969 births
20th-century linguists
21st-century linguists
Bemidji State University faculty
Date of birth missing (living people)
Living people
Native American linguists
Native American studies
Ojibwe people
People from Washington, D.C.
Princeton University alumni
University of Minnesota alumni